Chaoyang County is a county of northwestern Liaoning province, China. It is under the administration of Chaoyang city.

Administrative divisions
There are 1 Subdistrict, 14 towns and 12 townships in the county.

Subdistrict:
Liucheng
Towns:
 Damiao, Wafangzi, Liujiazi, Dapingfang, Boluochi, Mutouchengzi, Ershijiazi, Yangshan,Gushanzi(),Nanshuangmiao,Taizi,Qingfengling(),Shengli,Qidaoling()

Townships:
Lianhe Township, Dongdatun Township,  Beigoumen Township, Beisijiazi Township, Wulanhe Township, Dongdadao Township, Heiniuyingzi Township, Gende Township, Wangyingzi Township, Shangzhi Township, Songlingmen Township

Jiajiadian Farm

References

External links

County-level divisions of Liaoning
Chaoyang, Liaoning